Amerila shimbaensis is a moth of the subfamily Arctiinae. It was described by Christoph L. Häuser and Michael Boppré in 1997. It is found in south-eastern Kenya and Tanzania.

References

Moths described in 1997
Amerilini
Moths of Africa